Robert Malcolm Simcock (born 1947) is a New Zealand politician. He was a Member of Parliament for the National Party from 1996 to 2002 and Mayor of Hamilton from 2007 to 2010.

Early career
Simcock attended St John's College before graduating from the University of Waikato with a M Soc Sci (Hons).
Before entering politics, Simcock worked both as a deer farmer and as a clinical psychologist.

Member of Parliament

Simcock was an MP from 1996 to 2002, representing the National Party. He was first elected in the 1996 election as MP for Hamilton West, defeating the incumbent, Martin Gallagher of the Labour Party. In the 1999 election, Gallagher retook the seat from Simcock, who returned to Parliament as a list MP. In the 2002 election, Simcock again trailed Gallagher in Hamilton West, and National Party votes nationwide dropped enough that Simcock was not re-elected as a list MP.

Local government
Simcock was elected to the Hamilton City Council for the West Ward in the 2004 election and appointed Deputy Mayor that year. Following Michael Redman's resignation, he was appointed Mayor of Hamilton in May 2007. He was elected mayor in the October 2007 election with over 50% of the votes cast. He lost the 2010 mayoral election to Julie Hardaker.

Simcock was elected to the Waikato Regional Council in 2013 and re-elected in 2016.

Other activities
Simcock was appointed as the chair of the Waikato District Health Board by the Minister of Health in 2013. He resigned as chair and board member on 28 November 2017, following the resignation of Waikato DHB chief executive Nigel Murray, amidst a State Services Commission investigation into allegations of wrongful expenditure of public money by Murray. Murray was seen as Simcock's appointment by former CEO Craig Climo; Climo and former Labour MP Sue Moroney said they advised against hiring Dr Murray.

References 

1947 births
Living people
Mayors of Hamilton, New Zealand
Deputy mayors of places in New Zealand
New Zealand farmers
New Zealand National Party MPs
University of Waikato alumni
New Zealand list MPs
Members of the New Zealand House of Representatives
New Zealand MPs for North Island electorates
Unsuccessful candidates in the 2002 New Zealand general election
People educated at St John's College, Hamilton
21st-century New Zealand politicians
Waikato District Health Board members